Errol Millington (29 August 1914 – 29 April 1991) was a Barbadian cricketer. He played in three first-class matches for the Barbados cricket team from 1946 to 1951.

See also
 List of Barbadian representative cricketers

References

External links
 

1914 births
1991 deaths
Barbadian cricketers
Barbados cricketers
People from Saint Michael, Barbados